Football Club Novi Travnik is a football club from Novi Travnik, Bosnia and Herzegovina, currently playing in the Second League of the Federation of Bosnia and Herzegovina - West.

History
The club was officially founded in September 1950, although the football section was established in 1949. The club was at first called NK Borac and later FK Bratstvo and played in regional leagues until it was dissolved in the early 1990s due to conditions during the Bosnian War. After the war FK Bratstvo was re-established, but folded again in 2002 due to financial difficulties.

On 27 April 2013, the club was reformed under the name NK Novi Travnik and started playing in the SBK Canton League, winning the league in its first season, as well as winning the divisional cup. The following season, the club once again topped the table and was promoted to the First League of the Federation of Bosnia and Herzegovina.

Honours

External links
Official site

References

Football clubs in Bosnia and Herzegovina
Sport in the Federation of Bosnia and Herzegovina
Association football clubs established in 1949
2013 establishments in Bosnia and Herzegovina